Nemipterus furcosus, the fork-tailed threadfin bream, also known as the rosy threadfin bream, is a species of threadfin bream native to Indian oceanic seas around Maldives, Sri Lanka, Andaman islands, and Pacific oceanic seas around Indonesia, and Australia. It typically has a silver colored belly and red color on its dorsal, head and tail.

References

 Itis.org
 Animaldiversity Web
 WoRMS
 Fishes of Australia : Nemipterus furcosus

External links
 

furcosus
Marine fish of Northern Australia
Fish described in 1830
Taxa named by Achille Valenciennes